Richard Trinkler  (born 22 August 1950) is a retired track cyclist and road bicycle racer from Switzerland, who was a professional rider from 1987 to 1989. He represented his native country at the 1984 Summer Olympics in Los Angeles, California, where he won the silver medal in the men's team time trial, alongside Alfred Achermann, Laurent Vial and Benno Wiss. He also rode at the 1976 Summer Olympics and 1980 Summer Olympics.

References

External links
 

1950 births
Living people
People from Münchwilen District
Swiss male cyclists
Cyclists at the 1976 Summer Olympics
Cyclists at the 1980 Summer Olympics
Cyclists at the 1984 Summer Olympics
Olympic cyclists of Switzerland
Olympic silver medalists for Switzerland
Olympic medalists in cycling
Medalists at the 1984 Summer Olympics
Sportspeople from Thurgau